Mānabasā Gurubāra is a festival celebrated by Odia Hindus in the Indian state of Odisha. It is also celebrated by Odias living in Andhra Pradesh, Chhattisgarh, South Jharkhand and South West Bengal. In this festival Goddess Mahalaxmi is the presiding deity. It is believed by the people that the goddess herself comes to every household and removes pain and sorrow. It is held on every Thursday in the month of Margasira.

It is believed that Goddess Lakshmi loves a clean house so all women make their houses clean then decorate the house with jhoti chita. It is believed that the most beautiful house of the village will be visited by Goddess Lakshmi and can get money and prosperity.

History

This festival is based on the Hindu mythology of Goddess Laxmi in Laxmi Puran. In this Purana, once the Goddess Laxmi visited Shriya, a scavenger Low caste woman, for which Balaram, the elder brother of Jagannath got angry with Laxmi, and she was turned out from Jagannath Temple, Puri, one of the four most sacred places of Pilgrimage (Dham) of the Hindus. Laxmi leaves the temple, and avenges the insult by cursing her husband and elder brother-in-law to go through a prolonged ordeal without food, water or shelter. The Purana raises voice against the evil practices of Untouchability in society. It also stresses importance on feminism, and empowers the female power to resist male hegemony. As per this Laxmi Puran, puja is performed for Goddess Laxmi.

References 

Festivals in Odisha
Odia culture
Cultural history of Odisha
November observances
December observances